Kalvan, formerly known as Calvin Morrison, is a character  from the fictional Kalvan series started by H. Beam Piper. He was a state trooper of the Pennsylvania State Police, who was accidentally picked up by a cross-time flying saucer (really a Paratime conveyor) and carried to another timeline.

Life before Hostigos
Calvin Morrison was the son of a Presbyterian minister who had pressured him into studying for the ministry. However, his main academic interest was history, particularly military history. At the outbreak of the Korean War, he left his studies and joined the Army. Sometime after the war, he joined the Pennsylvania State Police, rising to the rank of corporal.

On May 19, 1964, Calvin was on a police assignment when he was picked up by a "cross-time flying saucer" and carried to another timeline.  According to First Level designations, Calvin was originally from Fourth Level, Europo-American, Hispano-Columbian sub-sector.  Calvin was transported to Fourth Level, Aryan-Transpacific, Styphon's House sub-sector.

Arrival in Hostigos
Calvin found himself in another world that looked like Pennsylvania.  He is also surrounded by old-growth forest, and he knows the area was clear-cut in the past.  This initially leads him to believe that he has traveled several centuries forward in time.   However, certain features were not the same, such as some nearby mountains not being quarried, a rather permanent alteration of the known landscape.

Morrison finds some friendly peasants who speak an unknown language. In the middle of a meal, they are attacked by a large raiding party, which he is instrumental in routing. Reinforcements arrive and, in the confusion, he is shot by the beautiful young woman leading them. 

Fortunately, the bullet hits his badge, saving his life, though he is still seriously wounded. While recuperating, he learns the new language.  Calvin learned that the people called themselves the Zarthani and that he was in the Princedom of Hostigos, which was part of the Great Kingdom of Hos-Harphax.  Hostigos is ruled by Prince Ptosphes and it was Ptosphes daughter Rylla who shot Calvin.  The Zarthani do not use surnames and pronounce Calvin's name as Kalvan, the name that Calvin is known by after that point.  Kalvan learns that Hostigos is being threatened by the Princedom of Nostor and the Princedom of Sask.  

Hostigos had very little gunpowder (or fireseed as it was called) because the Hostigi had been placed under the Ban of Styphon.  Styphon was one of the Zarthani gods, and the priests of Styphon control the production and distribution of fireseed.  

Kalvan, however, knew the ingredients and the formulation of gunpowder, and created a batch to show the Hostigi, which performs better than the Styphoni variety.  Soon the Hostigi were creating fireseed in secret while Kalvan prepared their army.  Kalvan introduced the rapier and rifling, and also improved the Hostigi cannons by moving the Princedom away from bombards and into fieldpieces with trunnions, including retrofitting their existing guns with trunnions.  Kalvan and the Hostigi army launched a surprise attack on Tarr-Dombra, which was controlled by the Nostori.  After the castle (or Tarr as they are known in the language of the Zarthani) was captured, Kalvan sent the Nostori the recipe for making fireseed, since the real enemy of the Hostigi is Styphon's House and not Nostor, which is merely their pawn.

Appearances
 Lord Kalvan of Otherwhen—First appearance
 Great Kings' War
 Kalvan Kingmaker
 Siege at Tarr-Hostigos

Discrepancies
 Pennsylvania State Troopers do not wear badges.   However, since Lord Kalvan of Otherwhen takes place in H. Beam Piper's Paratime setting of near-infinite timelines, there is no reason to believe that Calvin Morrison did not originate on a timeline that is very similar but not identical to the real world; a timeline in which members of the Pennsylvania State Police do wear badges.

Kalvan series
Fictional police officers